Kalkriese is a village now administratively part of the city of Bramsche in the district of Osnabrück, Lower Saxony, Germany. It is on the northern slope of the Wiehen Hills, a ridge-like range of hills, north of Osnabrück.

The anti-Roman alliance was led by Arminius, an officer of Varus' auxiliary forces who had acquired Roman citizenship and received a Roman military education.

The passage along the northern slope of the Kalkrieser Berg is a difficult one because of the need to cross many deep brooks and rivulets.  
Since the start of official explorations in 1988 more than 5,500 Roman objects, mainly pieces of military equipment, have been found in an area covering : The objects include Roman swords and daggers, parts of javelins and spears, arrowheads, sling stones, fragments of helmets, soldiers' boot nails, belts, chainmail hooks, and fragments of armor. Among the most significant items is the earliest known Imperial face-mask. Other items include locks, keys, razors, a scale, weights, chisels, hammers, pickaxes, buckets, finger rings, surgical instruments, seal boxes, a stylus, cauldrons, casseroles, spoons, and amphorae. Jewelry, hairpins, and a disk brooch suggest the presence of women. One of the inscribed objects is a plumb bob with "CHOI", or "C(o)HO(rtis) I", i.e. "property of the first cohort". The other one is a chainmail fastener with the inscription: "M AIUS (cohortis) I (centuriae) FABRICI(i) M AII (cohortis) I (centuriae) FAB(ricii)" ("Marcus Aius of cohort I, centuria of fabricii; property of Marcus Aius of cohort I, centuria of fabricii"). A coin struck to commemorate Augustus's adoption of his grandsons Lucius and Gaius in 2 BC has also been found at Kalkriese. In 2016, an archaeological investigation found eight aurei close together at the site, adding to the seven Roman gold coins previously found and tending to corroborate the identification of Kalkriese as the site of the battle.

See also 
 Angrivarian Wall

Notes

External links
Kalkriese Museum

Roman sites in Germany
Archaeological sites in Germany
Geography of Lower Saxony
Hills of Lower Saxony
Germania